= ServGru =

A ServGru or SERVGRU is standard United States Navy abbreviation or acronym for "Service Group." A Service Group may contain a number of Service Squadrons or Service Divisions.

The Commander of a Service Group is known, in official Navy communications, as COMSERVGRU (followed by a number), such as COMSERVGRU THREE.
